Hisar Junction railway station (railway code: HSR) is an A-category railway station, under the Bikaner railway division of North Western Railway zone of Indian Railways, located at Hisar city in Hisar district of Haryana state of India. The station consists of 6 platforms, with 6 broad-gauge mostly electrified tracks of Bathinda–Rewari line and Jakhal–Hisar–Sadalpur line, going in 4 directions at an average speed of 120 km/hours. Hisar is one of the 400 stations to be redeveloped with international and private partners for modernization on international standards and optimizing the commercial opportunities.

Location
Under the NCR Proposed Transport Plan, a high-speed rail Delhi–Hisar Regional Rapid Transit System (RRTS) link is also planned.

History 

The Hisar station itself has 6 platforms and 8 tracks to accommodate trains on these four lines. The railway station is a part of Western Dedicated Rail Freight Corridor, to be developed as an export-oriented industrial unit.

In 1873 during the British Raj, the Rajputana–Malwa Railway extended the -wide metre-gauge Delhi–Rewari line to Hisar, and then to Bhatinda in 1883–84, connecting it all the way to Karachi via Delhi–Karachi line. The metre-gauge Hisar–Sadulpur link was converted to broad gauge in 2009. In 2013, track doubling and electrification of Hisar–Rewari track via Hansi and Bhiwani commenced, which was completed in 2016. In 2017, the Hisar–Bhatinda via Sirsa electrification was under progress.

In 1911–13, the broad-gauge Hisar–Sadalpur line connecting Hisar with Jodhpur–Bathinda line at Sadulpur (Rajgarh) in Rajasthan was built. In 1913, Ludhiana–Jakhal line via Sangrur, built in 1901 (possibly by the Southern Punjab Railway Company) was extended to Hisar, thus forming the Ludhiana–Jakhal–Hisar–Sadalpur link which connected with Jodhpur–Bikaner–Sadalpur–Bathinda line at Sadalpur (Rajgarh) and Delhi–Fazilka line at Jakhal. Earlier in 1983, an agreement for the construction, working and  maintenance of the railway line was signed between the British Raj and the native princely states of Jind State, Malerkotla State and Patiala State to construct the broad-gauge Ludhiana–Dhuri–Jakhal line which was situated partly in British territory and partly in the territory lying in these native states. In 2017, Hisar–Ludhiana via Barwala and Jakhal  electrification by the Rail Vikas Nigam Limited is already under progress. In 2017, Hisar–Sadalpur and to Bikaner proposal for the track electrification was also approved. After conversion to electric, the trains would move at an average speed of 120 km/hours, instead of earlier 70 km/hr speed of diesel engines.

In fy 2013–14, a small museum was also set up in the waiting room and Rohtak–Hansi line was approved to complete the direct link from Delhi to Hisar, without the need to undergo the current Hansi–Bhiwani–Hisar detour, the line is under construction with a likely completion date by 2020.

In fy 2014–15, survey work for the new Uklana-Narwana line (29 km) and Hansi–Jind line (45 km) was also announced. In fy 2017–18, the railway minister announced the annual union railway budget allocation to Haryana of INR 1,247 crore (US$200 million), to undertake the new 45 km long Hansi–Jind line at the cost of INR 900 crore (US$140 million) on a 50:50 equity share with the state, INR 25 lakh (US$40,000) for the surveys for new 55 km Jyotisar-Yamunanagar line (via Kurukshetra, Ladwa and Radaur) and for new 65 km Kaithal–Patiala line, installation of two escalators for the busiest platforms, notification of Hisar as one among the 400 stations to be redeveloped with international and private partners for modernization on international standards and optimizing the commercial opportunities, and electrification of the following six existing routes at the cost allocation of INR 511.52 crore (US$85 million) in fy 2017–18: Narwana–Kurukshetra line, Panipat–Jind line, Panipat–Rohtak line, Garhi Harsaru–Farukhnagar line (12 km within Gurgram), Rewari–Rohtak line and Rewri–Sadulpur-Hanumangarh line. In contrast, the average annual union rail budget allocation to Haryana for new works was INR 315 crore (US$47 million) and INR 635 crore (US$95 million) between 2009–10 to 2013–14 and between 2014–15 and 2016–17 respectively.

In fy2018–19 budget on 9 March 2018, Captain Abhimanyu, Finance Minister of Haryana, announced that the government is in talks with Indian railway to introduce 200 km/hour speed rail from Hisar to Delhi once the under-construction Rohtak–Hansi rail link is completed.

See also
 Hisar Airport

References

External links
 

Railway junction stations in Haryana
Hisar
Bikaner railway division
Buildings and structures in Hisar (city)
Transport in Hisar (city)
Rail transport in Haryana
1873 establishments in British India